Nicola Marschall (March 16, 1829 – February 24, 1917) was a German-American artist who supported the Confederate cause during the American Civil War. He designed the original Confederate flag, the Stars and Bars, as well as the official grey uniform of the Confederate army.

Biography
On March 16, 1829, Marschall was born in St. Wendel, Germany, to a wealthy Prussian family of tobacco merchants.

In 1849, Marschall emigrated to the United States through New Orleans, Louisiana, headed for the home of a relative in Mobile, Alabama.

In 1851, Marschall relocated to Marion, Alabama, where he began teaching art first at his portrait studio, and then at the Marion Female Seminary. During this time he briefly returned to Germany to further his art technique.

Mary Clay Lockett, wife of prominent Marion attorney Napoleon Lockett, requested of Marschall to take part in the competition to create a new flag to represent the Confederate States of America. Marschall's design became the first Confederate flag, first raised in Montgomery, Alabama, on March 4, 1861.  During the Civil War, Marschall served in the Second Regiment of Confederate Engineer Troops, under Samuel Lockett.  After the war, he returned to Marion and married Martha Eliza Marshall.

During his career, Marschall painted portraits of Jefferson Davis, Abraham Lincoln, Otto von Bismarck, various Southern families, and Confederate and Union soldiers. He was one of the few who was able to have Nathan Bedford Forrest pose for him. Additionally, he did many landscapes and religious paintings.  He was known to sign and date his portraits using a steel pen while the paint was still wet, at the bottom-right of the portrait.

Due to the economic depression in the South following the war, Marschall returned to Mobile in 1872. In 1873, he and his family moved to Louisville, Kentucky, as his friends told him it would be an easier place to gain commissions to do portraits. At the Centennial International Exposition in Philadelphia in 1876, he won a medal for his portraits.

In 1908, Marschall gave up working on portraits.

On February 24, 1917, Marschall died in Louisville, Kentucky. His remains were interred at Cave Hill Cemetery.

Gallery

References

External links
  Sarah Rebecca Robins at the Birmingham Museum of Art

1829 births
1917 deaths
Artists from Louisville, Kentucky
People of Alabama in the American Civil War
Confederate States Army officers
Burials at Cave Hill Cemetery
American people of German descent
People from Sankt Wendel (district)
Painters from Kentucky
Painters from Alabama
American male painters
American portrait painters
19th-century American painters
19th-century American male artists
20th-century American painters
Prussian emigrants to the United States
Flag designers
20th-century American male artists